Bellier's lemniscomys or Bellier's striped grass mouse (Lemniscomys bellieri) is a species of rodent in the family Muridae.
It is found in Burkina Faso, Ivory Coast, Ghana, Guinea, and possibly Sierra Leone.
Its natural habitat is typically a dry savanna region.

References

Lemniscomys
Rodents of Africa
Mammals described in 1975
Taxonomy articles created by Polbot